Westerlo is a town in Albany County, New York, United States.  The population was 3,194 at the 2020 census.

The town is on the southern border of Albany County  and is served by New York State Route 143.

History 

Westerlo was formed from parts of the Towns of Coeymans and Rensselaerville in 1815.  It is named after Rev. Eilardus Westerlo (1738–1790), who was minister of the Reformed Protestant Dutch Church (now called The First Church) in Albany, NY, from 1760 to 1790.

Geography

Demographics

As of the census of 2000, there were 3,466 people, 1,326 households, and 970 families residing in the town.  The population density was 59.9 people per square mile (23.1/km2).  There were 1,537 housing units at an average density of 26.6 per square mile (10.3/km2).  The racial makeup of the town was 98.27% White, 0.55% African American, 0.12% Native American, 0.20% Asian, 0.14% from other races, and 0.72% from two or more races. Hispanic or Latino of any race were 0.92% of the population.

There were 1,326 households, out of which 33.9% had children under the age of 18 living with them, 60.6% were married couples living together, 7.8% had a female householder with no husband present, and 26.8% were non-families. 22.2% of all households were made up of individuals, and 9.4% had someone living alone who was 65 years of age or older.  The average household size was 2.61 and the average family size was 3.06.

In the town, the population was spread out, with 26.5% under the age of 18, 5.4% from 18 to 24, 28.9% from 25 to 44, 26.6% from 45 to 64, and 12.6% who were 65 years of age or older.  The median age was 39 years. For every 100 females, there were 95.3 males.  For every 100 females age 18 and over, there were 95.2 males.

The median income for a household in the town was $48,488, and the median income for a family was $55,660. Males had a median income of $39,516 versus $28,393 for females. The per capita income for the town was $21,000.  About 4.4% of families and 5.4% of the population were below the poverty line, including 5.9% of those under age 18 and 2.5% of those age 65 or over.

Hannay Reels, the nation’s largest manufacturer of hose reels, is located in Westerlo.

Communities and locations in Westerlo 
Basic Estates – Residential Development off County Route 401 overlooking the Basic Creek Reservoir
Bramans Corners – A location at the northern town line.
Dormansville  – A  hamlet near the eastern town line.
Ford Corners – A location north of Westerlo hamlet.
Lambs Corner – A hamlet in the southwestern part of the town.
Newry – A hamlet at the southern town line.
Snyder's Corners – A location northwest of Westerlo village.
South Westerlo – A hamlet near the southern town line.
Westerlo – The hamlet of Westerlo is near the center of the town.

References

External links

  Berne Historical Project has genealogy of Hilltown families including Westerlo
 Albany Hilltowns is a One-Place Study on the history of the Albany County Hilltowns of Berne, Knox, Westerlo, and Rensselaerville, and the families that lived there.

Towns in Albany County, New York